Alexander Wilson (1849 – 3 December 1927) was an Irish-born Australian politician.

He was born in County Antrim to William Watson and Jane Smyth. He attended the Royal Academical Institution of Belfast before arriving in New South Wales in 1865; he became a pastoralist. In 1880 he was elected to the New South Wales Legislative Assembly for Murray; he was defeated in 1885, but returned as the member for Bourke in 1887. He did not contest the 1889 election, but did run unsuccessfully for Randwick in 1895 and Sydney-King in 1901. Wilson died at Lewisham in 1927.

References

 

1849 births
1927 deaths
Members of the New South Wales Legislative Assembly
Free Trade Party politicians